Michael Allen Eusebio (born September 9, 1985), better known by his stage name  Ketchup Eusebio, is a Filipino actor.

Filmography

Television

Film

Accolades

References

External links

Star Magic
ABS-CBN personalities
Tagalog people
Filipino male film actors
Living people
Place of birth missing (living people)
1985 births
Filipino male television actors
Filipino male comedians